Hesket is a civil parish in the Eden District, Cumbria, England.  It contains 65 listed buildings that are recorded in the National Heritage List for England.  Of these, three are listed at Grade II*, the middle of the three grades, and the others are at Grade II, the lowest grade.  The parish is largely rural, and contains the villages of High Hesket, Low Hesket, Armathwaite, Plumpton, Calthwaite, Southwaite, and smaller settlements.  Most of the listed buildings are houses and associated structures, farmhouses and farm buildings.  The Settle-Carlisle Line of the former Midland Railway passes through the eastern part of the parish, and two viaducts on the line are listed.  Two of the buildings originated as tower houses or fortified houses, and have since been extended into country houses.  The other listed buildings include churches and items in the churchyards, a chapel, public houses, a former water mill, a well head, bridges, a monument, a war memorial, and three boundary stones.


Key

Buildings

References

Citations

Sources

Lists of listed buildings in Cumbria